Double Espresso is a live album performed by The Tony Levin Band at the Bearsville Theater, Woodstock, New York.

Track listing

Disk One
 "Pieces Of The Sun" - 7:15
 "Geronimo" - 3:27
 "Silhouette" - 4:35
 "Dog One" - 5:36 (Peter Gabriel cover)
 "Tequila" - 5:15 (rearrangement of The Champs song)
 "Black Dog" - 5:35 (Led Zeppelin cover)
 "Ooze" - 4:33
 "Apollo" - 8:44
 "L'Abito della Sposa" - 4:06
 "Sleepless" - 6:59 (King Crimson cover)

Disk Two
 "Pillar of Fire" - 6:59
 "Ever The Sun Will Rise" - 7:48
 "Phobos" - 7:01 (band arrangement of a song recorded by Larry Fast under his Synergy project name)
 "The Fifth Man" - 5:56
 "Back in N.Y.C." - 6:13 (Genesis cover)
 "Utopia" - 7:39
 "Elephant Talk" - 5:51 (King Crimson cover)
 "Peter Gunn" - 3:48 (Henry Mancini cover)
 "Belle" - 4:24

Personnel
Larry Fast : synthesizers, bass drum (disc1-07)
Jesse Gress : guitars, vocals (disc1-04 and 05)
Tony Levin : bass, cello, Chapman stick, acoustic guitar (disc1-08), lead vocals (disc1-09, disc2-07), vocals (disc1-04,05 and 10)
Jerry Marotta : drums, sax, vocals, percussion (disc1-05), acoustic guitar (disc1-08), Funk Finger guitar (disc1-07), lead vocals (disc1-10, disc2-05)
The California Guitar Trio (Bert Lams, Hideyo Moriya, Paul Richards) : acoustic guitars (disc2-08)
Doug Stringer : drums (disc1-05)
Pete Levin : keyboards (disc2-09)

Production 
Produced by Tony Levin
Recorded live at Bearsville Theater, Woodstock, NY, except disc2-08 recorded at Blueberry Hill, St. Louis
Recorded, Assembly and Pre-Remixing Engineering : Robert Frazza
Mixing Engineer : Terry Brown
Mastering Engineer : David Torn

References

External links

Double Espresso at papabear.com 
Tony Levin's official website

Tony Levin albums
2002 live albums
Narada Productions live albums